Cham Asiyab (also Romanized as Cham Āsīyāb; also known as Chamāsiyāb) is a village in Poshteh-ye Zilayi Rural District, Sarfaryab District, Charam County, Kohgiluyeh and Boyer-Ahmad Province, Iran. At the 2006 census, its population was 62, in 10 families.

References 

Populated places in Charam County